Shanhour is a village in Qus in the Qena governorate of the Arab Republic of Egypt, and there are distinct Aaronian monuments from the rest of the villages. The population of Shenhour is 22,654 and it covers an area of 274 acres.

References

External links 

Cities in ancient Egypt
Ancient Greek archaeological sites in Egypt
Roman sites in Egypt
Populated places in Qena Governorate
Qus
Qus Markaz villages